Tommy McCook (3 March 1927 – 5 May 1998) was a Jamaican saxophonist. A founding member of The Skatalites, he also directed The Supersonics for Duke Reid, and backed many sessions for Bunny Lee or with The Revolutionaries at Channel One Studios in the 1970s.

Biography
While some sources claim that McCook was born in Havana, Cuba, and moved to Jamaica in 1933, others claim that he was born in Kingston, Jamaica. He took up the tenor saxophone at the age of eleven, when he was a pupil at the Alpha School, and eventually joined Eric Deans' Orchestra.

In 1954, he left for an engagement in Nassau, Bahamas, after which he ended up in Miami, Florida, and it was here that McCook first heard John Coltrane and fell in love with jazz. McCook returned to Jamaica in early 1962, where he was approached by a few local producers to do some recordings. Eventually he consented to record a jazz session for Clement "Coxson" Dodd, which was issued on the album as Jazz Jamaica. His first ska recording was an adaptation of Ernest Gold’s "Exodus", recorded in November 1963 with musicians who would soon make up the Skatalites.

During the 1960s and 1970s, McCook recorded with the majority of prominent reggae artists of the era, working particularly with producer Bunny Lee and his house band, The Aggrovators, as well as being featured prominently in the recordings of Yabby You and the Prophets (most notably on version sides and extended disco mixes), all while still performing and recording with the variety of line ups under the Skatalites name. 

When McCook was bandleader for The Supersonics, the band included bassist Jackie Jackson and drummer Paul Douglas, who became the rhythm section for Toots and the Maytals, when the era of reggae emerged from rocksteady.

McCook died of pneumonia and heart failure, aged 71, in Atlanta, on 5 May 1998.

Discography
Top Secret - 1969 - Techniques
Horny Dub - 1976 - Grounation
Reggae In Jazz - 1976 - Eve
Cookin' Shuffle - Jamaica Authentic
Hot Lava
The Authentic Ska Sound of Tommy McCook - Moon Records (1998)
Down On Bond Street - Trojan Records (1999)
Tommy's Last Stand - Creole - 2001
Blazing Horns - Tenor In Roots - 1976-1978 - Blood & Fire (2003)
Real Cool - 1966-1977 - Trojan Records (2005)

With The Skatalites
Tommy McCook & The Skatalites - The Skatalite! - 1969 - Treasure Island

With Bobby Ellis
Green Mango - 1974 - Attack
Blazing Horns - 1977 - Grove Music

With The Aggrovators
Brass Rockers - 1975 - Striker Lee
Cookin'  - 1975 - Horse/Trojan
King Tubby Meets The Aggrovators At Dub Station - 1975 - Live and Love
Show Case - 1975 - Culture Press (1997)
Disco Rockers (aka Hot Lava) - 1977 - Dynamic Sound
Instrumental Reggae - RAS (1992)

With Yabby You
Yabby You Meets Tommy McCook In Dub - Peacemaker
Yabby You Meets Sly & Robie Along With Tommy McCook - Prophets

With Herbie Mann
Reggae (Atlantic, 1973)
Reggae II (Atlantic, 1973 [1976])

References

External links
Discography at Discogs
King Tubby Meets The Agrovators At Dub Station album review 

Jamaican reggae musicians
Jamaican saxophonists
Male saxophonists
Jamaican ska musicians
Cuban emigrants to Jamaica
The Skatalites members
1927 births
1998 deaths
People from Havana
Island Records artists
Trojan Records artists
Rocksteady musicians
20th-century saxophonists
20th-century male musicians